Aphelia disjuncta is a species of moth of the family Tortricidae. It is found in Russia and China.

References

Moths described in 1924
Aphelia (moth)
Moths of Asia